Fine-art photography is photography created in line with the vision of the photographer as artist, using photography as a medium for creative expression. The goal of fine-art photography is to express an idea, a message, or an emotion. This stands in contrast to representational photography, such as photojournalism, which provides a documentary visual account of specific subjects and events, literally representing objective reality rather than the subjective intent of the photographer; and commercial photography, the primary focus of which is to advertise products, or services.

History

Invention through 1940s 
One photography historian claimed that "the earliest exponent of 'Fine Art' or composition photography was John Edwin Mayall", who exhibited daguerreotypes illustrating the Lord's Prayer in 1851.  Successful attempts to make fine art photography can be traced to Victorian era practitioners such as Julia Margaret Cameron, Charles Lutwidge Dodgson, and Oscar Gustave Rejlander and others.  In the U.S. F. Holland Day, Alfred Stieglitz and Edward Steichen were instrumental in making photography a fine art, and Stieglitz was especially notable in introducing it into museum collections.

In the UK as recently as 1960, photography was not really recognised as a Fine Art. Dr S. D. Jouhar said, when he formed the Photographic Fine Art Association at that time: "At the moment, photography is not generally recognized as anything more than a craft. In the USA photography has been openly accepted as Fine Art in certain official quarters. It is shown in galleries and exhibitions as an Art. There is not corresponding recognition in this country. The London Salon shows pictorial photography, but it is not generally understood as an art. Whether a work shows aesthetic qualities or not it is designated 'Pictorial Photography' which is a very ambiguous term. The photographer himself must have confidence in his work and in its dignity and aesthetic value, to force recognition as an Art rather than a Craft".

Until the late 1970s several genres predominated, such as nudes, portraits, and natural landscapes (exemplified by Ansel Adams). Breakthrough 'star' artists in the 1970s and 80s, such as Sally Mann, Robert Mapplethorpe, Robert Farber and Cindy Sherman, still relied heavily on such genres, although seeing them with fresh eyes. Others investigated a snapshot aesthetic approach.

American organizations, such as the Aperture Foundation and the Museum of Modern Art(MoMA), have done much to keep photography at the forefront of the fine arts. MoMA's establishment of a department of photography in 1940 and appointment of Beaumont Newhall as its first curator are often cited as institutional confirmation of photography's status as an art.

1950s to present day

There is now a trend toward a careful staging and lighting of the picture, rather than hoping to "discover" it ready-made.  Photographers such as Gregory Crewdson, and Jeff Wall are noted for the quality of their staged pictures.  Additionally, new technological trends in digital photography have opened a new direction in full spectrum photography, where careful filtering choices across the ultraviolet, visible and infrared lead to new artistic visions.As printing technologies have improved since around 1980, a photographer's art prints reproduced in a finely-printed limited-edition book have now become an area of strong interest to collectors.  This is because books usually have high production values, a short print run, and their limited market means they are almost never reprinted. The collector's market in photography books by individual photographers is developing rapidly.
According to Art Market Trends 2004 7,000 photographs were sold in auction rooms in 2004, and photographs averaged a 7.6 percent annual price rise from 1994 and 2004. Around 80 percent were sold in the United States, although auction sales only record a fraction of total private sales. There is now a thriving collectors' market for which the most sought-after art photographers will produce high quality archival prints in strictly limited editions. Attempts by online art retailers to sell fine photography to the general public alongside prints of paintings have had mixed results, with strong sales coming only from the traditional major photographers such as Ansel Adams.

In addition to the "digital movement" towards manipulation, filtering, or resolution changes, some fine artists deliberately seek a "naturalistic," including "natural lighting" as a value in itself. Sometimes the art work as in the case of Gerhard Richter consists of a photographic image that has been subsequently painted over with oil paints and/or contains some political or historical significance beyond the image itself. The existence of "photographically-projected painting" now blurs the line between painting and photography which traditionally was absolute.

Framing and print size
Until the mid-1950s it was widely considered vulgar and pretentious to frame a photograph for a gallery exhibition. Prints were usually simply pasted onto blockboard or plywood, or given a white border in the darkroom and then pinned at the corners onto display boards. Prints were thus shown without any glass reflections obscuring them. Steichen's famous The Family of Man exhibition was unframed, the pictures pasted to panels. Even as late as 1966 Bill Brandt's MoMA show was unframed, with simple prints pasted to thin plywood. From the mid-1950s to about 2000 most gallery exhibitions had prints behind glass. Since about 2000 there has been a noticeable move toward once again showing contemporary gallery prints on boards and without glass. In addition, throughout the twentieth century, there was a noticeable increase in the size of prints.

Politics

Fine art photography is created primarily as an expression of the artist's vision, but as a byproduct it has also been important in advancing certain causes. The work of Ansel Adams in Yosemite and Yellowstone provides an example. Adams is one of the most widely recognized fine art photographers of the 20th century, and was an avid promoter of conservation. While his primary focus was on photography as art, some of his work raised public awareness of the beauty of the Sierra Nevada and helped to build political support for their protection.

Such photography has also had effects in the area of censorship law and free expression, due to its concern with the nude body.

Overlap with other genres
Although fine art photography may overlap with many other genres of photography, the overlaps with fashion photography and photojournalism merit special attention.

In 1996 it was stated that there had been a "recent blurring of lines between commercial illustrative photography and fine art photography," especially in the area of fashion. Evidence for the overlap of fine art photography and fashion photography includes lectures, exhibitions, trade fairs such as Art Basel Miami Beach, and books.

Photojournalism and fine art photography overlapped beginning in the "late 1960s and 1970s, when... news photographers struck up liaisons with art photography and painting".  In 1974 the International Center of Photography opened, with emphases on both "humanitarian photojournalism" and "art photography".  By 1987, "pictures that were taken on assignments for magazines and newspapers now regularly reappear[ed] - in frames - on the walls of museums and galleries".

New smartphone apps such as Snapchat sometimes are used for fine-art photography.

Attitudes of artists in other fields

The reactions of artists and writers have contributed significantly to perceptions of photography as fine art. Prominent painters, such as Francis Bacon and Pablo Picasso, have asserted their interest in the medium:

Noted authors, similarly, have responded to the artistic potential of photography:

List of definitions
Here is a list of definitions of the related terms "art photography", "artistic photography", and "fine art photography".

In reference books
Among the definitions that can be found in reference books are:
 "Art photography": "Photography that is done as a fine art -- that is, done to express the artist's perceptions and emotions and to share them with others".
 "Fine art photography": "A picture that is produced for sale or display rather than one that is produced in response to a commercial commission".
 "Fine art photography": "The production of images to fulfill the creative vision of a photographer. ... Synonymous with art photography".
 "Art photography": A definition "is elusive," but "when photographers refer to it, they have in mind the photographs seen in magazines such as American Photo, Popular Photography, and Print, and in salons and exhibitions. Art (or artful) photography is salable.".
 "Artistic photography": "A frequently used but somewhat vague term.  The idea underlying it is that the producer of a given picture has aimed at something more than a merely realistic rendering of the subject, and has attempted to convey a personal impression".
 "Fine art photography": Also called "decor photography," or "photo decor," this "involves selling large photos... that can be used as wall art".

In scholarly articles
Among the definitions that can be found in scholarly articles are:
 In 1961, Dr S. D. Jouhar founded the Photographic Fine Art Association, and he was its chairman. Their definition of Fine Art was “Creating images that evoke emotion by a photographic process in which one's mind and imagination are freely but competently exercised.”
 Two studies by Christopherson in 1974 defined "fine art photographers" as "those persons who create and distribute photographs specifically as 'art.
 A 1986 ethnographic and historical study by Schwartz did not directly define "fine art photography" but did compare it with "camera club photography".  It found that fine art photography "is tied to other media" such as painting; "responds to its own history and traditions" (as opposed to "aspir[ing] to the same achievements made by their predecessors"); "has its own vocabulary"; "conveys ideas" (e.g., "concern with form supersedes concern with subject matter"); "is innovative"; "is personal"; "is a lifestyle"; and "participates in the world of commerce."

On the World Wide Web
Among the definitions that can be found on the World Wide Web are:
 The Library of Congress Subject Headings use "art photography" as "photography of art," and "artistic photography" (i.e., "Photography, artistic") as "photography as a fine art, including aesthetic theory".
 The Art & Architecture Thesaurus states that "fine art photography" (preferred term) or "art photography" or "artistic photography" is "the movement in England and the United States, from around 1890 into the early 20th century, which promoted various aesthetic approaches. Historically, has sometimes been applied to any photography whose intention is aesthetic, as distinguished from scientific, commercial, or journalistic; for this meaning, use 'photography.
 Definitions of "fine art photography" on photographers' static Web pages vary from "the subset of fine art that is created with a camera" to "limited-reproduction photography, using materials and techniques that will outlive the artist".
On the concept of limited-reproduction, in the French legal system, there is a very precise legal definition regarding fine art photography being considered as an artwork. The tax code states they, "are considered as artworks the photographs taken by the artist, printed by him/herself or under his/her control, signed and numbered in maximum thirty copies, including all sizes and mountings."

See also
 Conceptual photography
 Fine art
 List of photographers
 List of most expensive photographs
 List of photographs considered the most important
 Pictorialism
 Nude photography (art)
 Tableau vivant

References

Notes

Further reading

 Thompson, Jerry L. Truth and photography: notes on looking and photographing. Chicago: Ivan R. Dee, 2003. 
 Bright, Susan. Art photography now. New York: Aperture, 2005. 
 Peres, Michael R. ed. The Focal encyclopedia of photography: digital imaging, theory and applications, history, and science. 4th edition. Amsterdam & Boston: Elsevier/Focal Press, 2007. 
 Rosenblum, Naomi. A world history of photography. 4th edition. New York: Abbeville Press, 2007.  
 Fodde, Marco. Fotografia Fine Art. 1st edition. Milano: Apogeo La Feltrinelli, 2012.  
 Antonio Luis Ramos Molina, La magia de la química fotográfica: El quimigrama. Conceptos, técnicas y procedimientos del quimigrama en la expresión artística, In: Tesis Doctoral, S. 293-297, Universidad de Granada 2018.

External links
 The 1896 Washington Salon & Art Photographic Exhibition An exhibition in Washington, D.C., more than a century ago played a major role in the establishment and acceptance of art photography in America (from the National Museum of American History).

 
Photography by genre
Visual arts genres